Kingswinford Rural District was a rural district in Staffordshire, England from 1894 to 1934. It was created by the Local Government Act 1894, and originally consisted of the two parishes of Amblecote and Kingswinford. Amblecote became a separate urban district in 1898, leaving Kingswinford the only parish in the district.

The district was abolished in 1934 under a County Review Order.  Most of the parish was added to the Brierley Hill Urban District, with Prestwood and Ashwood becoming to the parish of Kinver in the Seisdon Rural District. Since 1974, the former now forms a part of the Metropolitan Borough of Dudley in the West Midlands, whilst the area in Kinver is in the South Staffordshire district.

Neighbourhoods 
 Wall Heath
 Kingswinford
 High Acres
 Mount Pleasant
 Ashwood Park
 Bromley Hills
 Blaze Park

References

South Staffordshire District
History of Staffordshire
Local government in Staffordshire
Districts of England created by the Local Government Act 1894
Rural districts of England
History of Dudley